Udobnoye is a rural locality (a selo) in Gribsky Selsoviet of Blagoveshchensky District, Amur Oblast, Russia. The population was 121 as of 2018. There are 7 streets.

Geography 
Udobnoye is located 36 km southeast of Blagoveshchensk (the district's administrative centre) by road. Peredovoye is the nearest rural locality.

References 

Rural localities in Blagoveshchensky District, Amur Oblast